Lydia Dorothy West  (born 24 June 1993) is a British actress. She is known for her roles in the BBC One series Years and Years and the Channel 4 series It's a Sin, the latter of which earned her a BAFTA nomination.

Early life
West is from London. Her maternal grandparents are Irish, and her father is from Montserrat. Her mother is a nurse and her father works in charity. She has an older sister and an older brother.

West trained in ballet, tap, jazz and contemporary dance as a teenager, but quit after a foot injury. After graduating from university with a degree in business, she worked as a personal assistant and trained part-time at Identity School of Acting.

Career
Post graduation from IDSA, West was cast as Bethany Bisme-Lyons in Russell T Davies' 2019 BBC One and HBO series Years and Years. She starred in the 2021 Channel 4 series It's A Sin, also by Davies. She played Jill Baxter, who is loosely based on one of Davies' friends (Jill Nalder). Davies called her character "the heart of the story", a view echoed by Jack King of I-D who described the character as the "de facto matriarch". Her performance was described as a "standout" one by i.

In 2022, West appeared as Monique Thompson in the Apple TV+ series Suspicion and Reilly Clayton in Mike Myers' Netflix comedy The Pentaverate. She has roles in the films Love Again and Coffee Wars, as well as the series Inside Man and Gray.

Filmography

Film

Television

Audio

Awards and nominations

Notes

References

External links
 

Living people
21st-century English actresses
Actresses from London
Audiobook narrators
Black British actresses
English people of Irish descent
English people of Montserratian descent
English television actresses
English voice actresses
People from Islington (district)
1993 births